The Permanent Representative of Greece to NATO is the Permanent Representative of the Greek government to the North Atlantic Council.

References

NATO
 
 Greece Permanent Representatives
Greece